Kjersti Reenaas (born 24 February 1981) is a Norwegian ski-orienteering competitor and world champion. She won a gold medal in the relay event at the World Ski Orienteering Championships in Levi in 2005, together with Marte Reenaas and Stine Hjermstad Kirkevik. She placed 11th in both the long distance and the middle distance at the 2005 world championships.

References

Norwegian orienteers
Female orienteers
Ski-orienteers
1981 births
Living people
21st-century Norwegian women